Piz Tschierva (3,546 m) is a mountain in the Bernina Range of the Alps, located south of Pontresina in the canton of Graubünden. It lies in the range that separates the valley of Roseg from the valley of Morteratsch, north of Piz Bernina. Its summit is located within the valley of Roseg.

Piz Tschierva lies between two glaciers named Vadret da Misaun (north) and Vadrettin da Tschierva (south). The much larger Tschierva Glacier is located at the southern foot of the mountain.

Huts
 Tschierva Hut (2,583 m) (Chamanna Tschierva)
 Boval Hut (2,495 m) (Chamanna da Boval)

References 

 Collomb, Robin, Bernina Alps, Goring: West Col Productions, 1988. Collomb writes: '[Piz Tschierva is] a tame mountain compared with Piz Morteratsch, but a popular and useful training walk. Easily combined in the same day with the latter.' p. 76.

External links

 Piz Tschierva on SummitPost
 Piz Tschierva on Hikr

Bernina Range
Engadin
Mountains of Graubünden
Mountains of the Alps
Alpine three-thousanders
Mountains of Switzerland
Pontresina